The 1988 Kansas City Royals season was a season in American baseball. It involved the Royals finishing 3rd in the American League West with a record of 84 wins and 77 losses.

Offseason
 November 6, 1987: Danny Jackson and Angel Salazar are traded by the Royals to the Cincinnati Reds for Kurt Stillwell and Ted Power.
 December 10, 1987: Mélido Pérez, John Davis, Greg Hibbard, and Chuck Mount (minors) were traded by the Royals to the Chicago White Sox for Floyd Bannister and Dave Cochrane.

Regular season
 On Opening Day, the Royals faced the Toronto Blue Jays. The Blue Jays' George Bell set a record for the most home runs hit on Opening Day with three.

Season standings

Record vs. opponents

Notable transactions
 May 13, 1988: Bill Buckner was signed as a free agent by the Royals.
 May 27, 1988: Steve Balboni was released by the Royals.
 June 1, 1988: 1988 Major League Baseball draft
Bob Hamelin was drafted by the Royals in the 2nd round. Player signed June 11, 1988.
Kerwin Moore was drafted by the Royals in the 16th round. Player signed June 3, 1988.
 June 3, 1988: Bud Black was traded by the Royals to the Cleveland Indians for Pat Tabler.
 August 31, 1988: Ted Power was traded by the Royals to the Detroit Tigers for Rey Palacios and Mark Lee.

Roster

Game log

Regular season

|-

|-

|-

|-

|-

|-

|-

|- style="text-align:center;"
| Legend:       = Win       = Loss       = PostponementBold = Royals team member

Player stats

Batting

Starters by position
Note: Pos = Position; G = Games played; AB = At bats; H = Hits; Avg. = Batting average; HR = Home runs; RBI = Runs batted in

Other batters
Note: G = Games played; AB = At bats; H = Hits; Avg. = Batting average; HR = Home runs; RBI = Runs batted in

Pitching

Starting pitchers 
Note: G = Games pitched; IP = Innings pitched; W = Wins; L = Losses; ERA = Earned run average; SO = Strikeouts

Other pitchers 
Note: G = Games pitched; IP = Innings pitched; W = Wins; L = Losses; ERA = Earned run average; SO = Strikeouts

Relief pitchers 
Note: G = Games pitched; W = Wins; L = Losses; SV = Saves; ERA = Earned run average; SO = Strikeouts

Awards and records
George Brett, Silver Slugger Award
 Willie Wilson, American League Leader, Triples
 Willie Wilson, Tied Sam Crawford's American League record, Leading AL in Triples five times

Farm system

References

1988 Kansas City Royals at Baseball Reference
1988 Kansas City Royals at Baseball Almanac

Kansas City Royals seasons
Kansas City Royals season
Kansas City Royals